The  (UeG) was the overall unit of the Swiss Air Force professional pilots.

History 
In the 20th century, Swiss military pilots were fundamentally militia soldiers. On April 4, 1941, the Federal Council decided to create the Überwachungsgeschwader. Those pilots also served as flight instructors for new pilots.

From 1966 the UeG operated the Militär-Helikopter-Rettungsdienst (military helicopter rescue service) as a supplement to the civilian SAR.

The surveillance squadron had its headquarters on the Dübendorf Air Base and had disbanded by the end of 2005.

See also 
 Flieger-Flab-Museum

References

External links 
Flieger-Flab Museum
 Daniel A. Furrer: 60 Jahre Ueberwachungsgeschwader. Säntis Medien, Herisau 2001.
 Das Ueberwachungsgeschwader. L'Escadre de surveillance 1992- 2005, Ruckli, Hanspeter; Urscheler, Adrian Verlag: Baden Verlag Baden, 2006 ISBN/GTIN978-3-85545-141-8
 

Air force units and formations of Switzerland
Military units and formations established in 1941
Military units and formations disestablished in 2005
Dübendorf